A healthy diet is a diet that maintains or improves overall health. A healthy diet provides the body with essential nutrition: fluid, macronutrients such as protein, micronutrients such as vitamins, and adequate fibre and food energy.

A healthy diet may contain fruits, vegetables, and whole grains, and may include little to no processed food or sweetened beverages.  The requirements for a healthy diet can be met from a variety of plant-based and animal-based foods, although additional sources of vitamin B12 are needed for those following a vegan diet. Various nutrition guides are published by medical and governmental institutions to educate individuals on what they should be eating to be healthy. Nutrition facts labels are also mandatory in some countries to allow consumers to choose between foods based on the components relevant to health.

Recommendations

World Health Organization
The World Health Organization (WHO) makes the following five recommendations with respect to both populations and individuals:
 Maintain a healthy weight by eating roughly the same number of calories that your body is using.
 Limit intake of fats to no more than 30% of total caloric intake, preferring unsaturated fats to saturated fats. Avoid trans fats.
 Eat at least 400 grams of fruits and vegetables per day (not counting potatoes, sweet potatoes, cassava and other starchy roots). A healthy diet also contains legumes (e.g. lentils, beans), whole grains and nuts.
 Limit the intake of simple sugars to less than 10% of caloric intake. (Below 5% of calories or 25 grams may be even better).
 Limit salt/sodium from all sources and ensure that salt is iodized. Less than 5 grams of salt per day can reduce the risk of cardiovascular disease.

The WHO has stated that insufficient vegetables and fruit is the cause of 2.8% of deaths worldwide.

Other WHO recommendations include:
ensuring that the foods chosen have sufficient vitamins and certain minerals;
avoiding directly poisonous (e.g. heavy metals) and carcinogenic (e.g. benzene) substances;
avoiding foods contaminated by human pathogens (e.g. E. coli, tapeworm eggs);
and replacing saturated fats with polyunsaturated fats in the diet, which can reduce the risk of coronary artery disease and diabetes.

United States Department of Agriculture 

The Dietary Guidelines for Americans by the United States Department of Agriculture (USDA) recommends three healthy patterns of diet, summarized in the table below, for a 2000 kcal diet.

The guidelines emphasize both health and environmental sustainability and a flexible approach. The committee that drafted it wrote: "The major findings regarding sustainable diets were that a diet higher in plant-based foods, such as vegetables, fruits, whole grains, legumes, nuts, and seeds, and lower in calories and animal-based foods is more health promoting and is associated with less environmental impact than is the current U.S. diet. This pattern of eating can be achieved through a variety of dietary patterns, including the “Healthy U.S.-style Pattern”, the “Healthy Vegetarian Pattern" and the "Healthy Mediterranean-style Pattern". Food group amounts are per day, unless noted per week.

American Heart Association / World Cancer Research Fund / American Institute for Cancer Research
The American Heart Association, World Cancer Research Fund, and American Institute for Cancer Research recommend a diet that consists mostly of unprocessed plant foods, with emphasis on a wide range of whole grains, legumes, and non-starchy vegetables and fruits. This healthy diet includes a wide range of non-starchy vegetables and fruits which provide different colors including red, green, yellow, white, purple, and orange. The recommendations note that tomato cooked with oil, allium vegetables like garlic, and cruciferous vegetables like cauliflower, provide some protection against cancer. This healthy diet is low in energy density, which may protect against weight gain and associated diseases. Finally, limiting consumption of sugary drinks, limiting energy rich foods, including "fast foods" and red meat, and avoiding processed meats improves health and longevity. Overall, researchers and medical policy conclude that this healthy diet can reduce the risk of chronic disease and cancer.

It is recommended that children consume less than 25 grams of added sugar (100 calories) per day. Other recommendations include no extra sugars in those under 2 years old and less than one soft drink per week. As of 2017, decreasing total fat is no longer recommended, but instead, the recommendation to lower risk of cardiovascular disease is to increase consumption of monounsaturated fats and polyunsaturated fats, while decreasing consumption of saturated fats.

Harvard School of Public Health
The Nutrition Source of Harvard School of Public Health (HSPH) makes the following dietary recommendations:
 Eat healthy fats: healthy fats are necessary and beneficial for health. HSPH "recommends the opposite of the low-fat message promoted for decades by the USDA" and "does not set a maximum on the percentage of calories people should get each day from healthy sources of fat." Healthy fats include polyunsaturated and monounsaturated fats, found in vegetable oils, nuts, seeds, and fish. Foods containing trans fats are to be avoided, while foods high in saturated fats like red meat, butter, cheese, ice cream, coconut and palm oil negatively impact health and should be limited.
 Eat healthy protein: the majority of protein should come from plant sources when possible: lentils, beans, nuts, seeds, whole grains; avoid processed meats like bacon.
 Eat mostly vegetables, fruit, and whole grains.
 Drink water. Consume sugary beverages, juices and milk only in moderation. Artificially sweetened beverages contribute to weight gain because sweet drinks cause cravings. 100% fruit juice is high in calories. The ideal amount of milk and calcium is not known today. 
 Pay attention to salt intake from commercially prepared foods: most of the dietary salt comes from processed foods, "not from salt added to cooking at home or even from salt added at the table before eating."
 Vitamins and minerals: must be obtained from food because they are not produced in our body. They are provided by a diet containing healthy fats, healthy protein, vegetables, fruit, milk and whole grains.
Pay attention to the carbohydrates package: the type of carbohydrates in the diet is more important than the amount of carbohydrates. Good sources for carbohydrates are vegetables, fruits, beans and whole grains. Avoid sugared sodas, 100% fruit juice, artificially sweetened drinks, and other highly processed food.

Other than nutrition, the guide recommends staying active and maintaining a healthy body weight.

Others
David L. Katz, who reviewed the most prevalent popular diets in 2014, noted: 
The weight of evidence strongly supports a theme of healthful eating while allowing for variations on that theme. A diet of minimally processed foods close to nature, predominantly plants, is decisively associated with health promotion and disease prevention and is consistent with the salient components of seemingly distinct dietary approaches.

Efforts to improve public health through diet are forestalled not for want of knowledge about the optimal feeding of Homo sapiens but for distractions associated with exaggerated claims, and our failure to convert what we reliably know into what we routinely do. Knowledge in this case is not, as of yet, power; would that it were so.

Marion Nestle expresses the mainstream view among scientists who study nutrition:	
The basic principles of good diets are so simple that I can summarize them in just ten words: eat less, move more, eat lots of fruits and vegetables. For additional clarification, a five-word modifier helps: go easy on junk foods. Follow these precepts and you will go a long way toward preventing the major diseases of our overfed society—coronary heart disease, certain cancers, diabetes, stroke, osteoporosis, and a host of others.... These precepts constitute the bottom line of what seem to be the far more complicated dietary recommendations of many health organizations and national and international governments—the forty-one "key recommendations" of the 2005 Dietary Guidelines, for example. ... Although you may feel as though advice about nutrition is constantly changing, the basic ideas behind my four precepts have not changed in half a century. And they leave plenty of room for enjoying the pleasures of food.
Historically, a healthy diet was defined as a diet comprising more than 55% of carbohydrates, less than 30% of fat and about 15% of proteins. This view is currently shifting towards a more comprehensive framing of dietary needs as a global need of various nutrients with complex interactions, instead of per nutrient type needs.

Specific conditions
In addition to dietary recommendations for the general population, there are many specific diets that have primarily been developed to promote better health in specific population groups, such as people with high blood pressure (such as low sodium diets or the more specific DASH diet), or people who are overweight or obese (weight control diets). Some of them may have more or less evidence for beneficial effects in normal people as well.

Hypertension
A low sodium diet is beneficial for people with high blood pressure. A Cochrane review published in 2008 concluded that a long-term (more than four weeks) low sodium diet usefully lowers blood pressure, both in people with hypertension (high blood pressure) and in those with normal blood pressure.

The DASH diet (Dietary Approaches to Stop Hypertension) is a diet promoted by the National Heart, Lung, and Blood Institute (part of the NIH, a United States government organization) to control hypertension. A major feature of the plan is limiting intake of sodium, and the diet also generally encourages the consumption of nuts, whole grains, fish, poultry, fruits, and vegetables while lowering the consumption of red meats, sweets, and sugar. It is also "rich in potassium, magnesium, and calcium, as well as protein".

The Mediterranean diet, which includes limiting consumption of red meat and using olive oil in cooking, has also been shown to improve cardiovascular outcomes.

Obesity

The most effective treatment for obesity is bariatric surgery.
However, people who are overweight or obese can use healthy diets in combination with physical exercise in an attempt to lose weight, although this is particularly effective for only a short period (up to one year), after which some of the weight is typically regained. A meta-analysis of six randomized controlled trials found no difference between diet types (low-fat, low-carbohydrate, and low-calorie), with a 2–4 kilogram weight loss in all studies.

Gluten-related disorders

Gluten, a mixture of proteins found in wheat and related grains including barley, rye, oat, and all their species and hybrids (such as spelt, kamut, and triticale), causes health problems for those with gluten-related disorders, including celiac disease, non-celiac gluten sensitivity, gluten ataxia, dermatitis herpetiformis, and wheat allergy. In these people, the gluten-free diet is the only available treatment.

Epilepsy

The ketogenic diet is a treatment to reduce epileptic seizures for adults and children when managed by a health care team.

Research

Preliminary research indicated that a diet high in fruit and vegetables may decrease the risk of cardiovascular disease and death, but not cancer. Eating a healthy diet and getting enough exercise can maintain body weight within the normal range and reduce the risk of obesity in most people. A 2021 scientific review of evidence on diets for lowering the risk of atherosclerosis found that:
low consumption of salt and foods of animal origin, and increased intake of plant-based foods—whole grains, fruits, vegetables, legumes, and nuts—are linked with reduced atherosclerosis risk. The same applies for the replacement of butter and other animal/tropical fats with olive oil and other unsaturated-fat-rich oil. [...] With regard to meat, new evidence differentiates processed and red meat—both associated with increased CVD risk—from poultry, showing a neutral relationship with CVD for moderate intakes. [...] New data endorse the replacement of most high glycemic index (GI) foods with both whole grain and low GI cereal foods.

Scientific research is also investigating impacts of nutrition on health- and lifespans beyond any specific range of diseases.

Moreover, not only do the components of diets matter but the total caloric content and eating patterns may also impact health – dietary restriction such as caloric restriction is considered to be potentially healthy to include in eating patterns in various ways in terms of health- and lifespan.

Unhealthy diets

An unhealthy diet is a major risk factor for a number of chronic diseases including: high blood pressure, high cholesterol, diabetes, abnormal blood lipids, overweight/obesity, cardiovascular diseases, and cancer. The World Health Organization has estimated that 2.7 million deaths each year are attributable to a diet low in fruit and vegetables during the 21st century. Globally, such diets are estimated to cause about 19% of gastrointestinal cancer, 31% of ischaemic heart disease, and 11% of strokes, thus making it one of the leading preventable causes of death worldwide, and the 4th leading risk factor for any disease. As an example, the Western pattern diet is "rich in red meat, dairy products, processed and artificially sweetened foods, and salt, with minimal intake of fruits, vegetables, fish, legumes, and whole grains," contrasted by the Mediterranean diet which is associated with less morbidity and mortality.

Fad diet

Some publicized diets, often referred to as fad diets, make exaggerated claims of fast weight loss or other health advantages, such as longer life or detoxification without clinical evidence; many fad diets are based on highly restrictive or unusual food choices. Celebrity endorsements (including celebrity doctors) are frequently associated with such diets, and the individuals who develop and promote these programs often profit considerably.

Public health
Consumers are generally aware of the elements of a healthy diet, but find nutrition labels and diet advice in popular media confusing. Fears of high cholesterol were frequently voiced up until the mid-1990s. Later research shows that the distinction between high- and low-density lipoprotein is vital when considering the potential ill effects of cholesterol. 

Different types of dietary fat have different effects on blood levels of cholesterol. For example, polyunsaturated fats tend to decrease both types of cholesterol; monounsaturated fats tend to lower LDL and raise HDL; saturated fats tend to either raise HDL, or raise both HDL and LDL; and trans fat tend to raise LDL and lower HDL.

Dietary cholesterol is only found in animal products such as meat, eggs, and dairy. The effect of dietary cholesterol on blood cholesterol levels is controversial. Some studies have found a link between cholesterol consumption and serum cholesterol levels. Other studies have not found a link between eating cholesterol and blood levels of cholesterol. 

Vending machines in particular have come under fire as being avenues of entry into schools for junk food promoters, but there is little in the way of regulation and it is difficult for most people to properly analyze the real merits of a company referring to itself as "healthy." The Committee of Advertising Practice in the United Kingdom launched a proposal to limit media advertising for food and soft drink products high in fat, salt or sugar. The British Heart Foundation released its own government-funded advertisements, labeled "Food4Thought", which were targeted at children and adults to discourage unhealthy habits of consuming junk food.

From a psychological and cultural perspective, a healthier diet may be difficult to achieve for people with poor eating habits. This may be due to tastes acquired in childhood and preferences for sugary, salty and fatty foods. In 2018, the UK chief medical officer recommended that sugar and salt be taxed to discourage consumption. The UK government 2020 Obesity Strategy encourages healthier choices by restricting point-of-sale promotions of less-healthy foods and drinks.

Other animals
Animals that are kept by humans also benefit from a healthy diet, but the requirements of such diets may be very different from the ideal human diet.

See also

 Healthy eating pyramid
List of diets
Meals
Nutritionism
Nutrition scale
Nutritional rating systems
Planetary Health Diet
Plant-based diet
Table of food nutrients

References

External links
 Diet, Nutrition, and the Prevention of Chronic Diseases, by a Joint WHO/FAO Expert consultation (2003)
 

Dietetics
Diets
Nutrition guides